Zehava or Zahava (Hebrew: זֶהָבָה) is a Hebrew feminine given name that may refer to
Zehava Ben (born 1968), Israeli vocalist 
Zahava Burack (1932–2001), American philanthropist
Zahava Elenberg, Australian architect
Zehava Gal, Israeli-born operatic mezzo-soprano 
Zehava Gal-On (born 1956), Israeli politician 
Zehava Shmueli (born 1955), Israeli long-distance runner 

Hebrew feminine given names